Araya Station is the name of multiple train stations in Japan.

 Araya Station (Akita) - (新屋駅) in Akita Prefecture
 Araya Station (Gunma) - (新屋駅) in Gunma Prefecture